Zamindar is a 1952 Indian Tamil-language film directed by P. V. Krishnan and written by Jalakantapuram. The film was jointly produced by Jupiter Pictures and Sangeetha Pictures. It stars S. A. Nataraj and Madhuri Devi. The film was commercially unsuccessful.

Plot 

Allikulam is small Zamindari administered by the regent Pandi Thevar, who has plans to usurp it with the sudden and shocking demise of the Zamindar, his villainous brother also plans to usurp the property. These, the regent and the brother are at loggerheads with one trying to outdo the other. The story has many characters, Manmudi, a struggling farmer is man of discipline, even though he has a rough exterior and his sister Meenakshi is a good looking young woman. The villain plans to kidnap her. Indulging in murders and such crimes, more complications are woven into the story to create more interesting situations.

Cast 

Male cast
 S. A. Nataraj
 D. Balasubramaniam
 T. N. Sivathanu
 V. M. Ezhumalai
 S. S. Sivasooriyan
 S. M. Thirupathisami
 C. R. Nataraj
 R. Dhamodharam
 A. S. Gunapal
 O. A. K. Thevar
 M. A. Ganapathi
 V. T. Rajagopal

Male cast (continued)
 G. Muthukrishnan
 M. R. Santhanam
 M. S. Govindan
 K. P. Ramaiah
 T. B. Harihara Bhagavathar
 M. N. Krishnan
 M. M. A. Chinnappa
 S. S. Kathiresan
 V. Sivaramakrishnan
 S. Ramakrishnan
 J. D. Das
 A. Natesan

Female cast
 Madhuri Devi as Meenakshi
 M. M. Radha Bai
 T. P. Muthulakshmi
 R. Lakshmi Devi
 K. Rathnam
 P. Padmavathi
 M. V. Rajamma as Allikulam
 Pushpammal
 Rita as Gypsy Dancer
 Manickam
 Ranganayaki
 Meera

Soundtrack 
Music composed by G. Ramanathan and lyrics written by A. Maruthakasi and K. M. Sheriff. There was a gypsy dance by Rita which was choreographed by B. Hiralal. The Bharatha Natyam dances were choreographed by R. T. Krishnamoorthi.

References

External links 
 

1950s Tamil-language films
1952 films
Films scored by G. Ramanathan
Indian black-and-white films
Jupiter Pictures films